The sixth and last election to Tayside Regional Council was held on 5 May 1994 as part of the wider 1994 Scottish regional elections. The election saw the Scottish National Party overtaking Labour to become the council's largest party, and following the election the SNP formed a minority administration. The Conservatives lost 10 seats and became the third largest party. 8 weeks later, leader of the council Lena Graham resigned 'for personal reasons' and Ewan Dow took over as council leader.

Background
The Local Government (Scotland) Act 1973 created a two-tier system of local government in Scotland. Tayside was one of 9 regions, below which were 3 districts; Dundee, Angus and Perth and Kinross. The region was governed by Tayside Regional Council, whose 46 councillors were elected every 4 years using the first past the post voting system. The previous election was held on 3 May 1990, and ended in victory for Labour who took 18 seats. The Conservatives came second with 14 seats, and the SNP finished third with 10.

The SNP stood on a platform of anti-privatisation, campaigning against the Conservative government's attempts to privatise the water and sewerage systems. A total of 160 candidates stood for 46 seats; 40 women and 120 men. The SNP stood in the most electoral divisions (45), followed by the Conservatives (41), Labour (36), the Liberal Democrats (25) and the Scottish Greens (8). Two Liberal Democrat candidates were disqualified before the election after it transpired that their proposers had already nominated other individuals.

Aftermath
The election ended with the SNP as the largest party, gaining 12 seats, although they were short of an overall majority. Labour took legal action after the SNP won Whitfield by just 1 vote, alleging that a spoiled ballot paper was counted in the SNP candidate's favour. The challenge was dropped after the Labour candidate George Barr was allowed to examine the contentious ballot paper.

Some Labour councillors backed nominating candidates to convenerships, knowing that they could only be elected with Conservative support. This was condemned by Scottish Labour's general secretary Jack McConnell, who told the councillors that "no Labour administration worth its salt would get the support of the Tories". Conservative group leader Bruce Mackie denied such a move, saying "There is no question at all of us working in any alliance with any other party." The SNP eventually formed a minority administration, with former group leader Frances Duncan elected convener and Lena Graham elected as council leader. 

Graham resigned just 8 weeks into the role, and was replaced by Ewan Dow, a newly elected councillor. Dow was just 22 years old when he was appointed, making him the youngest Scottish council leader in history.

Aggregate results

Ward results
Each of the 46 electoral divisions elected one councillor. Boundaries were changed since the last election after a review by the Local Government Boundary Commission for Scotland.

Angus

City of Dundee

Perth and Kinross

References

1994 Scottish local elections
1994